Dianthus balbisii is a herbaceous perennial plant of the genus Dianthus of the family Caryophyllaceae. The genus name Dianthus derives from the Greek words for divine ("dios") and flower ("anthos"), while the species name balbisii honors the Italian botanist Giovanni Battista Balbis (1765–1831).

Description
 Dianthus balbisii is a hemicryptophyte scapose plant reaching on average  of height. The stem is erect and glabrous, the leaves are opposite, simple and linear. At the base of the cauline leaves a sheath embraces the stem. The epicalyx is formed by many leafy scales. The cylindrical tube of the calyx is green, deep purple-violet close to the 2 mm long teeth. The flowers are gathered into a dense cluster of 2–6 apical flowers in the axil of two bracts poorly differentiated from normal leaves. They have five pink-purplish petals, with frilled  margins. The flowering period extends from June through September. The fruits are capsules with several seeds.

Distribution
This species is present in Albania, Former Yugoslavia, Italy and France.

Habitat
This plant grows in dry meadows, woodlands and hillsides.

Subspecies
 Dianthus balbisii subsp. balbisii
 Dianthus balbisii Ser. subsp. liburnicus (Bartl.) Pignatti

Gallery

References
 Pignatti S. – Flora d'Italia – Edagricole – 1982. Vol. I, pag. 265

External links
 Alpenbotanicher
 
 Dianthus balbisii

balbisii